Lamkin is the surname of the following people
John Tillman Lamkin (1811–1870), US confederate politician
Phaedra Ellis-Lamkins (born 1976), American social justice advocate
Patricia Ann Lamkin (1963–2018), American singer and playwright
Speed Lamkin (1927–2011), American novelist and playwright
Uel W. Lamkin (1877–1956), American university administrator

See also
Lamkin, Texas